Laelia exclamationis is a moth of the family Erebidae first described by Vincenz Kollar in 1848. It is found in Sri Lanka, India and Taiwan.

References

Moths of Asia
Moths described in 1848